Abdul Hayee (8 March 1921 – 25 October 1980), popularly known by his pen name (takhallus) Sahir Ludhianvi, was an Indian poet and film song lyricist who wrote primarily in Urdu in addition to Hindi. He is regarded one of the greatest and revolutionary film lyricist and poet of the 20th century India.

His work influenced Indian cinema, in particular Hindi language films. Sahir won a Filmfare Award for Best Lyricist for Taj Mahal (1963). He won a second Filmfare Award for Best Lyricist for his work in Kabhie Kabhie (1976). He was awarded the Padma Shri in 1971. On 8 March 2013, the ninety-second anniversary of Sahir's birth, a commemorative stamp was issued in his honor.

Life

Early life and education 
Sahir was born on 8 March 1921, in a red sandstone haveli in Karimpura, Ludhiana, Punjab, India, into a Punjabi Muslim family. This is the reason why he added the suffix Ludhianvi after his name. His mother, Sardar Begum, left her husband thus forfeiting any claim to financial assets from the marriage. In 1934, Sahir's father remarried and sued (acrimoniously and unsuccessfully) for custody of his son. In a recent biography titled Sahir: A Literary Portrait (Oxford University Press) written by US-based author Surinder Deol, the author agrees with the very brief conclusion of Pakistani poet Ahmad Rahi, a friend of Sahir over the years, about Sahir's life story in a nutshell, "In his entire life, Sahir loved once, and he nurtured one hate. He loved his mother, and he hated his father." Sardar Begum required protection from Sahir's father and suffered financial deprivation. Sahir's place of birth is marked with a small plaque on the building's arched entrance.

Sahir was educated at the Khalsa High School in Ludhiana. He then enrolled at the Government College, Ludhiana. The auditorium there is named after him. As a college student, Sahir was popular for his ghazals and nazms (poetry in Urdu) and empassioned speeches.

Partition
In 1943, Sahir settled in Lahore. There, he completed Talkhiyaan (Bitterness) (1945), his first published work in Urdu. He was member of All India Students Federation. Sahir edited Urdu magazines such as Adab-e-Lateef, Shahkaar, Prithlari, and Savera and became a member of the Progressive Writers' Association. However, when he made controversial statements promoting Communism, a warrant for his arrest was issued by the Government of Pakistan. In 1949, after partition, Sahir fled from Lahore to Delhi. After eight weeks, Sahir moved to Bombay. He later lived in Andheri, a suburb of Mumbai. There, his neighbours included Gulzar, a poet and lyricist and Krishan Chander, an Urdu litterateur. In the 1970s, Sahir built a bungalow which he called Parchaiyaan (Shadows), after one of his works, and lived there until his death.

Death
On 25 October 1980, at the age of fifty-nine, Sahir died of a sudden cardiac death. He died in the presence of his friend, Javed Akhtar. He was buried at the Juhu Muslim cemetery. In 2010, his tomb was demolished to make room for new interments.

Career
Sahir's work as a lyricist in the film industry gave him financial stability beyond his earnings as a poet. He made his debut with four songs performed in the film Azadi Ki Raah Par (1949). One of the songs was Badal Rahi Hai Zindagi. Both the film and its songs went unnoticed. However, after Naujawan (1951 film), with music by S.D. Burman, Sahir gained recognition. Sahir's major success was Baazi (1951). Again, the composer was Burman. Sahir was then considered part of Guru Dutt's team. The last film Sahir made with Burman was Pyaasa (1957). In Pyaasa, Guru Dutt played a poet named Vijay. After Pyaasa (1957), Sahir and Burman went separate ways due to artistic and contractual differences.

Sahir did work with other composers including Ravi, Roshan, Khayyam and Datta Naik. Datta Naik also credited as N. Datta, a Goan, admired Sahir's poetry and their collaboration produced the score for Milaap (1955), Chandrakanta (1956), Saadhna (1958), Dhool Ka Phool (1959). Sahir also worked with music director Laxmikant–Pyarelal in the films like "Man Ki Aankhe", "Izzat", Dastaan and Yash Chopra's "Daag" all have fabulous songs. From about 1950 until his death, Sahir collaborated with Baldev Raj Chopra (1914 - 2008), a film producer and director. Sahir's last work for Chopra was for Insaaf Ka Tarazu. Yash Chopra, both while directing for B.R.films, and later as an independent director and producer, also engaged Sahir as the lyricist for his films, till Sahir's death.

In 1958, Sahir wrote the lyrics for Ramesh Saigal's film Phir Subah Hogi, which was based on Fyodor Dostoevsky's novel Crime and Punishment. The male lead was played by Raj Kapoor. It was presumed that Shankar–Jaikishan would be the composer but Sahir demanded a composer with a more intimate knowledge of the novel. Khayyam composed the film score. The song Woh Subah Kabhi Toh Aayegi with its minimal background music remains popular. Khayyam collaborated with Sahir in many films including Kabhie Kabhie and Trishul.

Sahir was a controversial figure in that he was artistically temperamental. He insisted that the film score should be composed for his lyrics and not the other way around. He also insisted on being paid one rupee more than Lata Mangeshkar and this created a rift between them. Sahir promoted his girlfriend, Sudha Malhotra's singing career. He also insisted that All India Radio credit film song lyricists.

Works

Poetry
Sahir wrote,

Instead, he wrote bitter yet sensitive lyrics about the declining values of society; the senselessness of war and politics; and the domination of consumerism over love. His love songs, tinged with sorrow, expressed his realisation that there were other, starker concepts more important than love.

Sahir might be called the "bard for the underdog". Close to his heart were the farmer crushed by debt, the soldier gone to fight someone else's war, the woman forced to sell her body, the youth frustrated by unemployment and the family living on the street for instance. Vijay, as he is passing through a red light area sings,

Sahir's poetry was influenced by noted Pakistani poet, Faiz Ahmed Faiz. Like Faiz, Sahir gave Urdu poetry an intellectual element that caught the imagination of the youth of the 1940s, 1950s and 1960s and reflected the feelings of the people of that period. He roused people from an independence-induced smugness. He would pick on the self-appointed custodian of religion, the self-serving politician, the exploitative capitalist, and the war-mongering super-powers. Sahir wrote with verve about the arrest of progressive writers in Pakistan; the launch of the satellite Sputnik and the discovery of Ghalib by a government lusting after minority votes. He wrote Kahat-e-Bangal (The Famine of Bengal) at 25 years of age. Subah-e-Navroz (Dawn of a New Day), mocks the way people celebrate while the poor exist in squalor. Of the Taj mahal, he wrote,

Sahir Ludhianvi asks his lover to meet him anywhere else but at the Taj Mahal: although the tomb has been a symbol of luxurious monarchy for years, there is no need for beautiful (but not famous) hearts to travel to meet there.

Sahir Ludhianvi recited this poetry couplet at his college event, when he was barely 19 years old, and created an uproar in the literary circles:

 
Of his legacy, Sahir writes,

Tomorrow there will be more who will narrate the love poems. May be someone narrating better than me.
May be someone listening better than you. Why should anyone remember me? Why should anyone remember me?
Why should the busy age waste its time for me?

Books
 Mahmood K. T. (2000) Kalām-i Sāḥir Ludhiyānvī. A collection of Ludhiavni's poetry with English translation.
 Abbas K. A. (1958) Shadows Speak: (Parchhalyan). 29 pages.
 Hassan R. (1977) The Bitter Harvest: Selections from Sahir Ludhiavni's Verse. 169 pages.
 Sucha S. (1989) Sorcery (Sahri): poetry. 
 Gaata jaye Banjara (1992). A collection of film lyrics.
 Bitterness: Talkhiyan

Bollywood songs
 "Thandi Hawayein Lehrake Aaye" sung by Lata Mangeshkar, composer S. D. Burman in Naujawan (1951).
 "Jayen To Jayen Kahan" sung by Talat Mahmood, composer S. D. Burman in Taxi Driver (1954).
 "Aana Hai To Aa", sung by Mohammed Rafi, in Naya Daur (1957) O.P. Nayyar, composer.
"Saathi Haath Badhana" in Naya Daur (1957), sung by Mohammed Rafi and Asha Bhonsle.
 "Jane Kya Tune Kahi" sung by Geeta Dutt, "Jane Woh Kaise" sung by Hemant Kumar and "Yeh Duniya Agar Mil Bhi Jaye Toh Kya Hai" sung by Mohammed Rafi in Pyaasa (1957) S.D. Burman, composer.
"Aurat Ne Janam Diya Mardon Ko" sung by Lata Mangeshkar, in Sadhna (1958) Datta Naik, composer.
 "Chin-o-Arab Hamara Hindustan Hamara", sung by Mukesh in Phir Subah Hogi (1959) Khayyam, composer.
 "Tu Hindu Banega Na Musalman Banega", sung by Mohammed Rafi in Dhool Ka Phool (1959) Datta Naik, composer.
 "Yeh Ishq Ishq Hai", sung by Mohammed Rafi and Manna De in Barsaat Ki Raat (1960) Roshan, composer.
 "Na To Karvan Ki Talash Hai", sung by Mohammed Rafi, Manna De, Asha Bhonsle and Sudha Malhotra in Barsaat Ki Raat (1960) Roshan, composer.
 "Allah Tero Naam Ishwar Tero Naam', sung by Lata Mangeshkar in Hum Dono (1961) Jaidev, composer. 
 "Main Zindagi Ka Sath Nibhata Chala Gaya", Hum Dono (1961) sung by Mohammed Rafi, Jaidev composer.
 "Kabhi Khud Pe Kabhi Haalat Pe Rona Aaya", Hum Dono (1961) sung by Mohammed Rafi, Jaidev, composer.
 "Abhi Na Jao Chhodkar Ke Dil Abhi Bhara Nahin", Hum Dono (1961) sung by Mohammed Rafi, Asha Bhosle, Jaidev, composer.
 "Chalo Ek Baar Phir Se Ajnabi Ban Jaye Hum Dono', sung by Mahendra Kapoor in Gumrah (1963) Ravi, composer.
Laaga Chunri Mein Daag" sung by Manna Dey in Dil Hi To Hai (1963 film), Roshan as the composer.
"Aye Meri Zoharjabin", Waqt (1965) sung by Manna Dey, Ravi (music director).
 "Aagey Bhi Jane Na Tu", film Waqt (1965) sung by Asha Bhonsle, Ravi, composer.
 "Tum Agar Saath Dene Ka Wada Karo", sung by Mahendra Kapoor in Hamraaz (1967), Ravi, composer.
 "Neele Gagan Ke Tale", Hamraaz (1967) sung by Mahendra Kapoor, Ravi composer.
"Ye Dil Tum Bin Kahin Lagata Nahin", Izzat (1968) Lata-Rafi, Laxmikant–Pyarelal.
 "Babul Ki Duaen Leti Ja", sung by Muhammed Rafi in Neelkamal (1968). 
 "Man Re Tu Kahe Na Dheer Dhare", sung by Mohammed Rafi and "Sansar Se Bhage Phirte Ho, Bhagwan Ko Tum Kya Paoge" sung by Lata Mangeshkar in Chitralekha (1964) Roshan, composer.
 "Tora Mann Darpan Kehlaye", sung by Asha Bhosle in Kaajal (1965) Ravi, composer.
 "Ishwar Allah Tere Naam", sung by Mohammed Rafi in Naya Raasta (1970) Datta Naik, composer.
"Chala Bhi Aa Aja Rasiya", Man Ki Aankhe (1970) Lata-Rafi, Laxmikant–Pyarelal.
"Na Tu Zameen Ke Liye Na Aasaman Ke Liye", Dastaan (1972) Mohammad Rafi, Laxmikant–Pyarelal.
"Mere Dil Mein Aaj Kya Hai", Daag (1973) sung by Kishore Kumar, Laxmikant Pyarelal, composer.
 "Main Pal Do Pal Ka Shair Hoon", sung by Mukesh in Kabhi Kabhi (1976) Khayyam, composer.
 "Kabhie Kabhie", sung by Mukesh, Lata Mangeshkar in Kabhi Kabhi (1976), Khayyam, composer.

Biographies
The 1957 Hindi movie, Pyaasa now considered a cinema classic, is inspired by Sahir's unrequited affection for the Hindi novelist and poet, Amrita Pritam and features several famous songs with lyrics written by him.

Sahir's life has been chronicled by Sabir Dutt and by Chander Verma and Dr. Salman Abid in "Main Sahir Hoon" 

In 2010, Danish Iqbal wrote a stage play entitled, Sahir, about the poet's life. It was successfully directed by Pramila Le Hunt in its Delhi premier. It used song to narrate Sahir's life.

Sahir Ludhianvi: the People's Poet by Akshay Manwani The book is the product of interviews and writings about Sahir given by his friends such as Yash Chopra, Dev Anand, Javed Akhtar, Khayyam, Sudha Malhotra, Ravi Chopra and Ravi Sharma. The book also analyses Sahir's poetry and lyrics in the context of his personal life. Sahir's contribution to the Progressive Writers’ Movement is also discussed.

Javed Akhtar, in an interview with Rekhta, has talked about how it is a matter of concern that Sahir's Poetry is still as relevant as it was when he wrote it. He, including many other have always considered Sahir more of a poet than a lyricist, though he played both the roles beautifully.

A feature film based on his life is rumored to be produced by Red Chillies and starring Shah Rukh Khan.

There is a biography written by Samad K. P. A. in Malayalam, Sahir: Aksharangalude Abhijhaarakan.

Awards and nominations

See also

 Hindi film music
 Shakeel Badayuni
 Indian Poets

References

External links 
 

1921 births
1980 deaths
Indian lyricists
Urdu-language poets from India
Urdu-language poets from Pakistan
Writers from Ludhiana
20th-century Indian Muslims
Pakistani emigrants to India
Filmfare Awards winners
Recipients of the Padma Shri in literature & education
Punjabi people
People from Ludhiana
20th-century Indian poets
Indian male poets
Poets from Punjab, India
20th-century Indian male writers
20th-century pseudonymous writers